Macroglossum saga, the grey-tipped hummingbird hawkmoth, is a moth of the family Sphingidae.

Biology 
Larvae have been recorded on Daphniphyllum macropodum in Korea.

References

Macroglossum
Moths described in 1878
Moths of Japan